Kegan Lake is a lake in Dakota County, in the U.S. state of Minnesota.

Kegan Lake was named for Andrew Keegan, a pioneer farmer.

See also
List of lakes in Minnesota

References

Lakes of Minnesota
Lakes of Dakota County, Minnesota